In mathematics, Vitale's random Brunn–Minkowski inequality is a theorem due to Richard Vitale that generalizes the classical Brunn–Minkowski inequality for compact subsets of n-dimensional Euclidean space Rn to random compact sets.

Statement of the inequality

Let X be a random compact set in Rn; that is, a Borel–measurable function from some probability space (Ω, Σ, Pr) to the space of non-empty, compact subsets of Rn equipped with the Hausdorff metric. A random vector V : Ω → Rn is called a selection of X if Pr(V ∈ X) = 1. If K is a non-empty, compact subset of Rn, let

and define the set-valued expectation E[X] of X to be

Note that E[X] is a subset of Rn.

where "" denotes n-dimensional Lebesgue measure.

Relationship to the Brunn–Minkowski inequality

If X takes the values (non-empty, compact sets) K and L with probabilities 1 − λ and λ respectively, then Vitale's random Brunn–Minkowski inequality is simply the original Brunn–Minkowski inequality for compact sets.

References

 
 

Probabilistic inequalities
Theorems in measure theory